A pronominal adverb is a type of adverb occurring in a number of Germanic languages, formed in replacement of a preposition and a pronoun by turning the former into a prepositional adverb and the latter into a locative adverb, and finally joining them in reverse order.

For example:

 For that → therefor (not therefore)
 In that → therein
 By this → hereby
 To this → hereto
 In which → wherein

Usage in English
In English, pronominal adverbs are most commonly encountered in literary registers or in legal usage.  They are used frequently by lawyers and drafters of legal documents primarily as a way of avoiding the repetition of names of things in the document (or sometimes as a self-reference to the document itself).  For this reason, pronominal adverbs are often seen as a type of legal jargon.

Usage in Dutch
In Dutch, pronominal adverbs are very common and are almost mandatory in many situations; neglecting to use them often makes a phrase sound unnatural to native speakers. Dutch maintains a three-way distinction of reference in its demonstrative pronouns, with pronouns for things close by and far away, and a third pronoun that is unspecific for distance. This distinction is faithfully reflected in the use of pronominal adverbs, and other pronouns also often have a corresponding adverbial form.

References

Adverbs by type